Valentin Coșereanu (born 17 July 1991) is a Romanian footballer who plays for Liga I side CS Mioveni. First match in Liga I was played for Mioveni against champion Oțelul Galați.

Honours

Gaz Metan Mediaș
Liga II: 2015–16

References

External links
 
 

1991 births
Living people
People from Scornicești
Romanian footballers
Association football midfielders
Romania under-21 international footballers
Liga I players
Liga II players
Liga III players
CS Mioveni players
CS Concordia Chiajna players
FC Politehnica Iași (2010) players
FC Argeș Pitești players
CS Gaz Metan Mediaș players